Neil Shepard (January 29, 1951 in Fitchburg, Massachusetts) is an American poet, essayist, professor of creative writing, and literary magazine editor. He is a recipient of the 1992 Mid-List Press First Series Award for Poetry, as well as a recipient of a fellowship from the Virginia Center for the Creative Arts and the MacDowell Colony. He routinely participates in poetry readings and writing workshops throughout the United States.

Career
Shepard received a BA from the University of Vermont, an MFA from Colorado State University, and a Ph.D. from Ohio University. He has taught at Louisiana State University, Rider University in New Jersey and Johnson State College in Vermont, as well as in the low-residency MFA writing program at Wilkes University and he was for a quarter-century the Senior Editor of the literary magazine Green Mountains Review. He has published eight books of poetry to positive reviews, his latest being How It Is: Selected Poems. His poems and essays appear in such magazines as Antioch Review, AWP Chronicle, Boulevard, Colorado Review, Denver Quarterly, Harvard Review, New American Writing, New England Review, North American Review, Ontario Review, Paris Review, Shenandoah, Small Press Reviews, Southern Review, TriQuarterly and Vermont Public Radio.

Poetic Influences
Shepard's first creative writing teacher was David Huddle, poet and short story writer at the University of Vermont. Shepard studied with William Tremblay for his Master's work at Colorado State University and with Stanley Plumly for his doctoral work at Ohio University.

His marriage to Kate Riley, linguistic anthropologist, introduced Shepard to the South Pacific, French language and French colonial culture. He accompanied Riley to the Marquesas Islands, where she conducted her fieldwork on language and culture, and eventually Shepard wrote the Marquesan poems that appear in his second book I'm Here Because I Lost My Way. The birth of his daughter also deeply affected his work. A section of poems called Birth Announcements appears in Shepard's third book, This Far from the Source.

Shepard's extensive travel, including year-long sojourns in Shanghai, China (1991), the Marquesas Islands in the South Pacific (1993), and France (2003) have also influenced his work. Shepard’s fourth book of poetry, (T)ravel/Un(t)ravel, records these experiences abroad. Shepard’s long association with Vermont is recorded in his fifth and seventh books, Vermont Exit Ramps and Vermont Exit Ramps II, which mix history, natural history, and personal history to investigate life along the highways of Vermont. His sixth book, Hominid Up, is his most overtly political book to date, the first section focused on urban life in New York City and the second section focused on rural life in northern New England. His eighth book, How It Is: Selected Poems, gathers poems from his previous seven collections.

Publications

External links
 Mid-List Press
 Big Table Publishing

American male poets
Living people
1951 births
People from Fitchburg, Massachusetts
Colorado State University alumni
Wilkes University faculty
Ohio University alumni
University of Vermont alumni
Louisiana State University faculty
Rider University faculty
Johnson State College faculty
American essayists
American magazine editors
American male essayists